Abu Eshaq or Abueshaq may refer to:
 Abu Eshaq-e Olya
 Abu Eshaq-e Sofla